The Critics' Choice Movie Award for Best Picture is one of the awards given to people working in the film industry by the Critics Choice Association at the annual Critics' Choice Movie Awards.

Winners and nominees

1990s

2000s

2010s

2020s

References

External links
 Official website

F
Lists of films by award
Awards for best film